Nusatsum Mountain (2,575 m/8,448 feet), is a mountain in the Pacific Ranges of the Coast Mountains of British Columbia, Canada, located near the Nusatsum River and south of and between the communities of Firvale and Hagensborg. The peak can be seen from Highway 20. The mountain is the equivalent of Mount Ararat in the traditions of the Nuxalk, as the place where survivors found refuge from the Great Flood. The landform's toponym was officially adopted March 13, 1947, by the Geographical Names Board of Canada. Other spellings of Nusatsum seen on older maps include "Nootsatsum", "Noosatum" and "Nutsatsum".

Climate

Based on the Köppen climate classification, Nusatsum Mountain is located in the marine west coast climate zone of western North America. Most weather fronts originate in the Pacific Ocean, and travel east toward the Coast Mountains where they are forced upward by the range (Orographic lift), causing them to drop their moisture in the form of rain or snowfall. As a result, the Coast Mountains experience high precipitation, especially during the winter months in the form of snowfall. Winter temperatures can drop below −20 °C with wind chill factors below −30 °C. This climate supports small glaciers on the mountain's slopes.

See also
 
 Geography of British Columbia
 List of place names in Canada of aboriginal origin

Gallery

References

Bella Coola Valley
Pacific Ranges
Nuxalk
Two-thousanders of British Columbia
Range 3 Coast Land District